Rolston 'Debu' Williams (3 February 1965 − 14 October 2020) was an Antiguan and Barbudan former professional football player and manager.

Career
In 2004, he coached the Antigua and Barbuda national football team. Later he was a head coach of the Parham FC. Also he worked with Antigua and Barbuda women's national football team and the U20 and U17 teams.

In November 2012 he again became the head coach of the Antigua and Barbuda team.

Rolston Debu Williams died on October 14, 2020.

References

External links
 
 Profile at Soccerpunter.com
 

1965 births
2020 deaths
Association football midfielders
Antigua and Barbuda footballers
Antigua and Barbuda international footballers
Antigua and Barbuda football managers
Antigua and Barbuda national football team managers